Ms! was a Canadian current affairs television series which aired on CBC Television in 1973.

Premise
CBC's 1972 attempt to produce a women's issues series, All About Women, was cancelled before its first broadcast on grounds that it excessively focused on sexuality. This effort featured a wider scope of topics including abortion, cosmetic surgery and spousal abuse. Margo Lane, who was selected to host All About Women, was host of this series.

Scheduling
This half-hour series was broadcast Thursdays at 10:00 p.m. (Eastern) from 28 June to 20 September 1973.

References

External links
 

CBC Television original programming
1973 Canadian television series debuts
1973 Canadian television series endings